Earl Nelson is a title of Trafalgar and of Merton in the County of Surrey, United Kingdom.

Earl Nelson may also refer to:

Earl Nelson (singer), part of the original soul music duo of Bob & Earl
Earl E. Nelson (1937–2016), Michigan politician
Ben Nelson (Earl Benjamin Nelson, born 1941), U.S. Senator from Nebraska

See also 
Earle Nelson (1897–1928), serial killer